Klaus-Jürgen Pohl (born 1 August 1941 in Demmin) is a German former wrestler who competed in the 1968 Summer Olympics and in the 1972 Summer Olympics.

References

External links
 

1941 births
Living people
Olympic wrestlers of East Germany
Wrestlers at the 1968 Summer Olympics
Wrestlers at the 1972 Summer Olympics
German male sport wrestlers
People from Demmin
Sportspeople from Mecklenburg-Western Pomerania